Sun Jiazheng (born March 1944) is a politician of the People's Republic of China. He served as Minister of Radio, Film and Television between 1994 and 1998, before serving as Minister of Culture of the People'e Republic of China from March 1998 to March 2008.
He was the chairman of the China Federation of Literary and Art Circles from 2006 to 2016.

Biography
Sun was born in Siyang, Jiangsu Province, during the Republic of China in March 1944. Sun joined the Chinese Communist Party in January 1966. He graduated from Nanjing University in 1968, where he majored in Chinese. After graduation, Sun labor at May Seventh Cadre School in Liuhe County, Jiangsu Province.

Sun entered politics in 1971 during the Cultural Revolution. After the Chinese Economic Reform, Sun served as secretary of Nanjing Committee of Chinese Communist Party, then served as secretary of Xuzhou Committee of Chinese Communist Party from 1984 to 1985. In December 1989, Sun served as deputy secretary of Jiangsu Committee of Chinese Communist Party. In April 1994, Sun was transferred to Ministry of Radio, Film and Television, where he was the minister for 4 years from 1994 to 1998.

In March 1998, Sun was appointed Minister of Culture of the People'e Republic of China. In November 2006, Sun was elected the Chairman of the China Federation of Literary and Art Circles. In March 2008, Sun was elected 11th vice chairman of the Chinese People's Political Consultative Conference.

References

1944 births
Politicians from Suqian
Nanjing University alumni
Living people
Ministers of Culture of the People's Republic of China
Vice Chairpersons of the National Committee of the Chinese People's Political Consultative Conference